Beatties Bluff (also Beattie's Bluff) is a ghost town located in Madison County, Mississippi, United States.

Once a thriving hamlet on the south shore of the Big Black River, which formed the northern boundary of the county, the settlement declined when it was replaced as the county seat. Nothing remains of it. In 2001, a new $32 million wastewater treatment plant was constructed here as part of infrastructure support for a Nissan plant in Canton.

History
Beatties Bluff was founded in the early 1800s as an outpost along the Natchez Trace.

When Yazoo County was created in 1823, Beatties Bluff was made its first county seat.  In 1829, the county seat was moved to Benton.  When Madison County was created in 1829, it too named Beatties Bluff as its first county seat.  Soon after, the county seat was moved to Livingston.

Boats would ascend the Big Black River to Beatties Bluff, which had a post office, court house, and other buildings made of hewn logs.

In 1835, rumors of a slave uprising were overheard on a plantation at Beatties Bluff.  Slaves there were tortured to extract information, which led to the arrest and quick execution of two itinerant white men.  This incident coincided with the general hysteria about slave uprisings known as the "Murrell Excitement".

When Beatties Bluff was replaced a second time as the county seat, it immediately lost businesses and residents to the new judicial center. It eventually became extinct.

In 2000, Nissan Motor Company began construction of a vehicle assembly plant in nearby Canton.  As part of the infrastructure, a site just west of the old town was selected in 2001 for the construction of the Beatties Bluff Wastewater Treatment Facility, capable of processing eight million gallons of water per day.

References

External links
 Photo of Beatties Bluff site

Former populated places in Madison County, Mississippi
Former populated places in Mississippi